If I Had You may refer to:

 If I Had You (film), a 2006 British TV film starring Sarah Parish
 "If I Had You" (1928 song), a jazz standard written by "Irving King" (Jimmy Campbell and Reg Connelly) with Ted Shapiro
 "If I Had You" (Alabama song), 1989
 "If I Had You" (Karen Carpenter song), 1989
 "If I Had You" (Debbie Harry song)
 "If I Had You" (Adam Lambert song), 2010
 "If I Had You", a song by The Korgis from their self-titled album (1979), also covered by Tracey Ullman and Rod Stewart
 "If I Had You", a song by Dire Straits from ExtendedancEPlay, 1983
 "If I Had You", a song by Irving Berlin